Michael Bonjozi Rumere (born 9 December 1993) is an Indonesian professional footballer who plays as a midfielder for Liga 1 club Persebaya Surabaya.

Club career

PSBS Biak
Rumere started his career as a professional football player with PSBS Biak since 2010, he played for his hometown club for 8 years. he totaled 40 matches with PSBS Biak and collected 8 goals.

Kalteng Putra
In the 2018 season, Rumere joined Kalteng Putra and managed to bring the club promotion to the highest caste of Liga 1. Rumere made his Liga 1 debut with Kalteng Putra took place in the second week of Liga 1 against Badak Lampung on 28 May 2019, he entered as a substitute when the time had entered the second half injury time, Rumere appeared in a total of 15 matches in the Liga 1.

Sulut United
He was signed for Sulut United to play in Liga 2 in the 2020 season. This season was suspended on 27 March 2020 due to the COVID-19 pandemic. The season was abandoned and was declared void on 20 January 2021.

On 6 October 2021, Rumere made his club debut by starting in a 1–1 drew against Persewar Waropen. He contributed with 7 league appearances and without scoring during with Sulut United.

Persebaya Surabaya
Rumere was signed for Persebaya Surabaya to play in Liga 1 in the 2022–23 season. He made his league debut on 25 July 2022 in a match against Persikabo 1973 at the Pakansari Stadium, Cibinong.

On 3 February 2023, Rumere coming on as a substituted Paulo Victor due hamstring injury, he playing as a forward for the first time, and success give assists to Altalariq Ballah in Persebaya's 3–2 win over Borneo Samarinda at Gelora Joko Samudro Stadium, Persebaya's coach, Aji Santoso gave him a permanent position, after his performance in the last few matches, Aji wanted to make him permanent at pure striker. On 13 February, Rumere came in as a starter and was trusted as a striker by the coach in the first half and scored his first league goal in a 4–2 home win against PSS Sleman.

Honours

Club 
Kalteng Putra
 Liga 2 third place (play-offs): 2018

References

External links
 Michael Rumere at Soccerway
 Michael Rumere at Liga Indonesia

1993 births
Living people
Indonesian footballers
Association football midfielders
PSBS Biak Numfor players
Kalteng Putra F.C. players
Persebaya Surabaya players
Liga 2 (Indonesia) players
Liga 1 (Indonesia) players
People from Biak
Sportspeople from Papua